= Voice Charter School =

Charter school in Queens, New York City

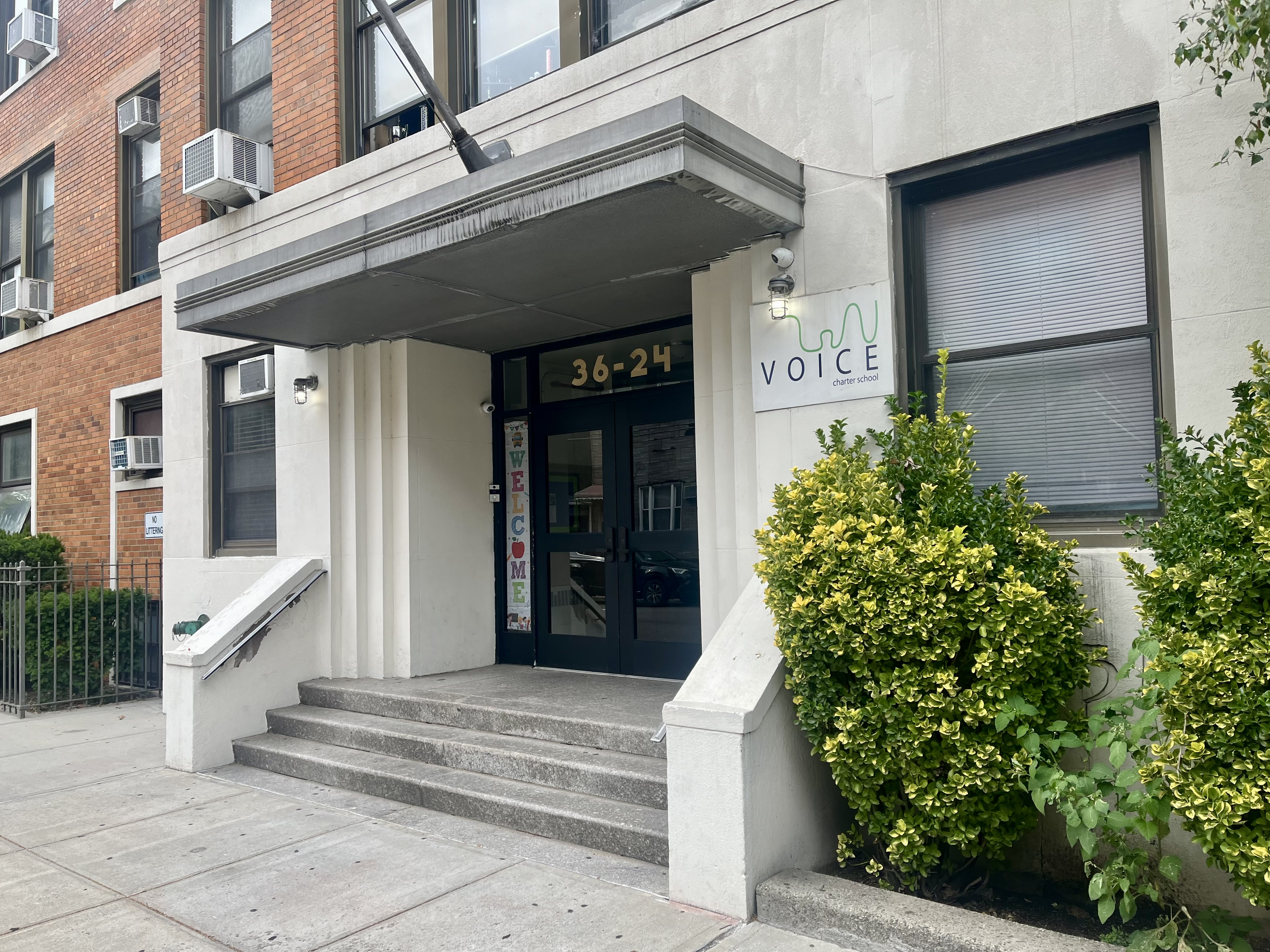
- The school's entrance in 2025

Location
- 36-24 12th St; Queens; New York City, New York; United States
- Coordinates: 40°45′37″N 73°56′23″W

Information
- School type: Charter
- Founded: 2008
- Grades: Kindergarten - 8th grade
- Gender: Co-ed
- Enrollment: 664 (2021-2022); 751 (2022-2023)
- Website: www.voicecharterschool.org

Voice Charter School, sometimes shortened to VCS, is a charter school located in Queens, New York City. As of April 2024, it serves students from kindergarten to eighth grade.

== History ==
Voice Charter School was founded in 2008.

Following the onset of the COVID-19 pandemic, some students declined their spots at the school. Because of this, the school decided to offer spots to 70 children from asylum-seeking families. By 2023, the school's population included 267 migrant students, the most of any charter school in the state.

== Education ==
All students are required to take music classes; in elementary school, these music classes are held daily. For students for whom English was not their first language, the music classes also help them with language acquisition.

The school also offers a soccer and track program, open to students regardless of gender.
